This list of bridges in Slovakia lists bridges of particular historical, scenic, architectural or engineering interest. Road and railway bridges, viaducts, aqueducts and footbridges are included.

Major road and railway bridges 
This table presents the structures with spans greater than 100 meters (non-exhaustive list).

Notes and references 
 

 Others references

See also 

 List of bridges in Bratislava city
 List of crossings of the Danube
 Transport in Slovakia
 Highways in Slovakia
 Rail transport in Slovakia
 Geography of Slovakia

External links

Further reading 
 
 

Slovakia
 
Bridges
Bridges